Baniapukur Ballygung Assembly constituency was a Legislative Assembly constituency of Kolkata district in the Indian state of West Bengal.

Overview
Beniapukur and Ballygunge were areas added to the Calcutta Corporation in 1889. Baniapukur Ballygung was the sole two-member assembly seat in Calcutta. One seat was reserved for Scheduled Castes, the other seat was unreserved.

Results
In independent India's first election in 1951, Jogesh Chandra Gupta and Pulin Behari Khatic, both of Indian National Congress, won. Amongst the independent candidates in the fray were Jogendra Nath Mandal, a former Minister of Pakistan, and Dr. A.M.O. Ghani.

References

Former assembly constituencies of West Bengal
Politics of Kolkata district